I'm Dancing as Fast as I Can is a 1982 American biographical film directed by Jack Hofsiss and starring Jill Clayburgh. The screenplay by David Rabe is based on the memoir of the same title by Emmy Award-winning documentary filmmaker Barbara Gordon, whose addiction to and difficult withdrawal from Valium serves as the basis of the plot.

Plot
Barbara Gordon appears to have it all, including a successful career in a male-dominated industry and a solid relationship with her live-in lover, attorney Derek Bauer. Beneath her facade is a high-strung personality who heavily relies on sedatives to reduce tension and anxiety and maintain a composed exterior for her friends and associates. Her current project focuses on cancer patient Jean Scott Martin and her husband Ben and how the couple is coping as the disease progresses. Despite reservations expressed by her collaborators, Barbara is determined to end the film on a positive note, showing the Martins embracing on the beach.

When she shows them a rough cut, fatalistic Jean is angered by the false optimism and vehemently voices her objections to Barbara's choices. The response triggers a deep depression in Barbara, who relies on Doctor Kalman, her therapist of many years, and an increased dosage of Valium to see her through the crisis. She finally reaches a turning point when she realizes Kalman's treatment has been ineffective and admits her dependence on drugs is controlling her life. Her effort to quit cold turkey results in a rapid physical, mental, and emotional deterioration fueled by Derek's refusal to let her seek medical help and his alcohol-driven determination to control her completely.

Following a series of physical fights, he imprisons her—bruised, bloodied, and broken—by tying her to a chair. She manages to convince him they had dinner plans with friends Karen and Sam Mulligan, and when he calls them to cancel, her screams for help alert them to her situation. Barbara is institutionalized and begins a long and arduous journey toward recovery with the help of Julie Addison. During this period, she is visited by Jean, who confesses she may have overreacted to Barbara's film and feels a sense of guilt over her breakdown.

Her encouragement inspires Barbara to get well and complete the project. Jean suggests she end the film with an image of Barbara walking on the beach, and she complies with her wishes. Jean dies before seeing the completed work, but a newly confident Barbara is certain she would have approved of it.

Production
Much of the film was shot on location in New York City. The hospital interiors and exteriors were filmed at Pomona College in Claremont, California.

Some of the original music composed by Stanley Silverman was performed by pianist Paul Jacobs. The soundtrack includes "I Guess I'll Have to Change My Plan" by Tony Bennett and Count Basie and "Our Love Is Insane" by Desmond Child and Rouge.

Cast
 Jill Clayburgh as Barbara Gordon 
 Nicol Williamson as Derek Bauer 
 Dianne Wiest as Julie Addison
 Geraldine Page as Jean Scott Martin 
 Albert Salmi as Ben Martin
 James Sutorius as Sam Mulligan 
 Ellen Greene as Karen Mulligan 
 Joseph Maher as Dr. Kalman
 Joe Pesci as Roger
 Daniel Stern as Jim
 Dan Hedaya as Dr. Klein  
 Kathleen Widdoes as Dr. Rawlings 
 Richard Masur as Alan Newman
 John Lithgow as Mr. Brunner 
 David Margulies as Walter Kress

Critical response
The film received negative reviews during its release. In her review in The New York Times, Janet Maslin called it a forceful and involving film. But it's not an especially revealing one. We never quite learn why Barbara Gordon, who is played earnestly and vigorously by Jill Clayburgh, has gotten into trouble. Although the film describes her illness and recovery in harrowing detail, it simply presents the symptoms ... I'm Dancing as Fast as I Can is often quite effective, by nature of the very nightmare that it chronicles. But its power is more bluntly disturbing than provocative or controlled. Geraldine Page particularly exemplifies this, in the role of a poet who is dying of cancer ... the film isn't sure how to use her. It returns to her periodically, as if trying not to be forgetful, rather than in a more dramatic or opportune way. It doesn't wonder why Barbara is more deeply attached to this woman than to anyone else in her life. And it chronicles her illness as much for its upsetting effect as to provide any insight into Barbara. This movie doesn't need any more distress than Barbara's story already provides.

According to Variety: "Crucial inability of a film to get inside a character's head spells big trouble for I'm Dancing As Fast As I Can. Result here is that Jill Clayburgh's constantly center-stage character comes off as the pill-popping dingbat she's called at one point, rather than as a fascinating lady with a major problem ... Only two members of the large supporting cast, Dianne Wiest and Geraldine Page, have any chance to develop their characters, and both do well."

I'm Dancing as Fast as I Can holds a 33% rating on Rotten Tomatoes based on six reviews.

References

External links
 
 

1982 films
1980s biographical drama films
American biographical drama films
1980s English-language films
Films about drugs
Films based on non-fiction books
Films produced by Scott Rudin
Films set in New York City
Paramount Pictures films
1982 drama films
1980s American films